Amphiachyris is a genus of flowering plants in the family Asteraceae described as a species in 1840.

Amphiachyris is endemic to the United States.

 Species
 Amphiachyris amoena (Shinners) Solbrig - Texas
 Amphiachyris dracunculoides (DC.) Nutt. - southern Great Plains, with a few scattered populations farther east

References

Astereae
Asteraceae genera
Flora of the United States